Microscolex is a genus of annelids belonging to the family Acanthodrilidae.
The genus has cosmopolitan distribution.

Species:

Microscolex algeriensis 
Microscolex anderssoni 
Microscolex aquarumdulcium

References

Annelids